Mundo Livre S/A is a Brazilian mangue bit band, formed in 1984 in Recife, Pernambuco. It is also one of the founders of that musical style, which became popular in the 1990s. Fred Zero Quatro, the band's singer, was one of the authors of Caranguejos com Cérebro, one of the landmarks of the Manguebeat movement, together with Renato L. and Chico Science.

Members
 Fred Zero Quatro, lead singer, guitar and cavaquinho
 Areia, bass
 Xef Tony, drums
 Léo D., keyboard
 Tom Rocha, percussion

Discography
 1994 - Samba Esquema Noise
 1996 - Guentando a Ôia
 1998 - Carnaval Na Obra
 2000 - Por Pouco
 2004 - O Outro Mundo de Manuela Rosário
 2005 - Bebadogroove
 2008 - Combat Samba - E se a gente sequestrasse o trem das 11?
 2011 - Novas Lendas da Etnia Toshi Babaa

Musical groups established in 1984
1984 establishments in Brazil
Brazilian musical groups
Recife